Weiss Airport  was a privately owned, public use airport located at 430 Rudder Ave in Fenton, Missouri in St. Louis County, Missouri, United States, approximately 13 nautical miles (24 km) WSW of St. Louis, Missouri. The airport closed on May 1, 1994.

Facilities and aircraft 
It had one asphalt paved runway designated 18/26 which measured 3,100 feet in length. It was the home of Midwest Air Service, and also served as a base for flight instruction.

References

External links 
 http://www.airfields-freeman.com/MO/Airfields_MO_SE.htm#weiss
  
 https://www.newspapers.com/clip/8876110/weiss-airport/
 https://www.facebook.com/pages/Weiss%20Airport/909144375829153/

Defunct airports in Missouri
Airports in Missouri
Buildings and structures in Missouri